The Church of the Assumption of the Blessed Virgin Mary is a Roman Catholic church in Gornji Vakuf-Uskoplje, Bosnia and Herzegovina.

See also
Catholic Church in Bosnia and Herzegovina

References

Uskoplje
Gornji Vakuf-Uskoplje
Roman Catholic churches completed in 1931
20th-century Roman Catholic church buildings in Bosnia and Herzegovina